Supiya (also spelled Supia) is a village in the Rewa district of Madhya Pradesh, India.

Demographics 
According to the 2011 census of India, it has 386 households with 1,572 people (828 males and 744 females). Out of these, 1,033 people are literate. The population includes 187 people belonging to Scheduled Castes and 239 people belonging to Scheduled Tribes.

Archaeology 
A 460 CE pillar inscription of the Gupta king Skandagupta has been discovered at Supiya.

References 

Villages in Rewa district